Trun is a rural locality (a selo) and the administrative center of Trunovskoye Rural Settlement, Chernushinsky District, Perm Krai, Russia. The population was 629 as of 2010. There are 11 streets.

Geography 
Trun is located 22 km southeast of Chernushka (the district's administrative centre) by road. Trun (settlement) is the nearest rural locality.

References 

Rural localities in Chernushinsky District